Something Wild may refer to:

Film and TV 

 Something Wild (1961 film), a drama starring Carroll Baker and Ralph Meeker
 Something Wild (1986 film), an action/comedy starring Jeff Daniels, Melanie Griffith, and Ray Liotta
 "Something Wild" (Dawson's Creek episode)

Music 
 Something Wild (album), the debut album by Children of Bodom 
 "Something Wild", a song by John Hiatt from Perfectly Good Guitar
 "Something Wild", a song by Iggy Pop from Brick by Brick
 "Something Wild", a song by Lindsey Stirling featuring Andrew McMahon

Other uses 
 Something Wild, an Australian native foods business part-owned by Daniel Motlop 
 Something Wild (module), an adventure module for the Planescape setting of Advanced Dungeons & Dragons